Rabbi Robert Wexler is the president of the American Jewish University (AJU), formerly known as the University of Judaism (UJ). He has been listed among the top 50 most influential American rabbis in Newsweek, ranking number seven in 2007 and ranking number three in 2008 and number six in 2009. He has also been included in the Forward's top 50 list of significant American Jewish leaders. He has published several articles, including contributions to the Encyclopaedia Judaica, the Etz Hayim Humash, and a volume entitled "Israel, the Diaspora and Jewish Identity".

See also
 David Lieber
 Etz Hayim Humash
 American Jewish University
 Conservative Judaism
 Orthodox Judaism
 Reform Judaism

References

External links
Message from Robert Wexler American Jewish University
 

American Conservative rabbis
American Jewish University faculty
Living people
Year of birth missing (living people)
21st-century American rabbis